Richard Goddard (born 28 April 1974) is an English former professional rugby league footballer who played in the 1990s and 2000s.

Playing career

International honours
Goddard won a cap for England while at Castleford Tigers in 1995 against France.

County Cup Final appearances
Goddard played as an  interchange/substitute in Wakefield Trinity's 29–16 victory over Sheffield Eagles in the 1992–93 Yorkshire County Cup Final during the 1992–93 season at Elland Road, Leeds on Sunday 18 October 1992.

Club career
Richard Goddard is the youngest player to make his début for Wakefield Trinity aged 16-years 3-months and 29-days in 1990.

References

External links
Profile at thecastlefordtigers.co.uk
Rugby League: Club-by-club guide to the new season
Rugby League: Crooks steals historic draw
Northern Ford Premiership: Goddard on target for Eagles
Eagles see off Leigh challenge

1974 births
Living people
Castleford Tigers players
England national rugby league team players
English rugby league players
Place of birth missing (living people)
Rugby league centres
Sheffield Eagles players
Wakefield Trinity players
York Wasps players